Kyrsyä – Tuftland (English: Tuftland) is a Finnish horror film, directed, produced and written by Roope Olenius that was released in 2017. The film stars Veera W. Vilo, Miikka J. Anttila, Saara Elina and Ria Kataja. It is based on a play Kyrsyä by Neea Viitamäki.

Plot 
A headstrong textile student tries to overcome her problems by accepting a summer job offer from an isolated and offbeat village of Kyrsyä.

Cast 
 Veera W. Vilo
 Saara Elina
 Miikka J. Anttila
 Ria Kataja
 Neea Viitamäki
 Arja Pekurinen
 Ari Savonen
 Janne-Markus Katila
 Mirja Oksanen
 Jari Manninen
 Katja Jaskari
 Enni Ojutkangas
 Sampo Marjomaa
 Matvei Ojansuu
 Jussi Tuomi
 Niina Ylipahkala

Production 
The filming of Kyrsyä – Tuftland took place in the summer 2016 in Espoo, Joensuu, Loimaa, Pori and Tampere. The film was Roope Olenius' directorial debut film and a Bright Fame Pictures production.

Release 
The film had its World Premiere in Texas, USA at Other Worlds Austin Film Festival on 9 December 2017, where the film won the Best Feature Director award. Olenius also won the First Look Award at Horrorant Film Festival in Athens, Greece. Tuftland was awarded for the Best Narrative Feature at Arizona Underground Film Festival, Best Feature Film at Cinemafantastique International Genre Film Fest in Canada and Best Domestic Feature at Scandinavian International Film Festival in Finland. It got nominations for Best Film at Horrorant Film Festival, Best International Female Actor (Veera W. Vilo) and Best Nordic Feature Film at Västerås Film Festival in Sweden. Altogether, the film played on 25 international film festivals.

The film was released theatrically in Finland by Bright Fame Pictures on 6 April 2018. A DVD and Blu-ray were released on 17 September 2018 in Finland.

Kyrsyä – Tuftland had a limited theatrical release in Greece on 22 November 2018 and USA on 1 March 2019.

A feature length making-of documentary Kyrsyä – Tuftland: From Stage to Screen was released internationally in 2019.

References

External links 
 
 
 Facebook page

2017 films
2017 horror films
Finnish films based on plays
Films shot in Finland
Finnish horror films
2017 directorial debut films